Alexander Brand (born January 31, 1977) is a male boxer from Colombia, who participated in the 2003 Pan American Games for his native country, where he reached the semi-finals, and in 2015, Brand defeated Bernard Donfack in dominant fashion to win the WBF world super middleweight title – a minor championship belt that is unrecognized by the International Boxing Hall of Fame.

Professional boxing record

|style="text-align:center;" colspan="9"|27 fights, 25 wins (19 knockouts), 2 losses, 0 draws
|-style="text-align:center; background:#e3e3e3;"
|style="border-style:none none solid solid; "|
|style="border-style:none none solid solid; "|Result
|style="border-style:none none solid solid; "|Record
|style="border-style:none none solid solid; "|Opponent
|style="border-style:none none solid solid; "|Type
|style="border-style:none none solid solid; "|Rd., Time
|style="border-style:none none solid solid; "|Date
|style="border-style:none none solid solid; "|Location
|style="border-style:none none solid solid; "|Notes
|-align=center
|27
|Loss
|25–2
|align=left| Andre Ward
|UD
|12
|06 Aug 2016
|align=left|
|align=left|
|-align=center
|26
|Win
|25–1
|align=left| Medzhid Bektemirov
|SD
|12
|05 Dec 2015
|align=left|
|align=left|
|-align=center
|25
|Win
|24–1
|align=left| Bernard Donfack
|UD
|12 
|09 Aug 2015
|align=left|
|align=left|
|-align=center
|24
|Win
|23–1
|align=left| Rey Recio
|TKO
|7 (8), 2:33
|19 Sep 2014
|align=left|
|align=left|
|-align=center
|23
|Win
|22–1
|align=left| Wilmer Mejia
|KO
|3 (10), 2:55
|01 Nov 2013
|align=left|
|align=left| 
|-align=center
|22
|Win
|align=center|21–1||align=left| Jorge Rodriguez Olivera
|RTD
|11 (12)
|07 Aug 2013
|align=left|
|align=left|
|-align=center
|21
|Win
|align=center|20–1||align=left| Orlando de Jesus Estrada
|TKO
|2 (10), 2:00
|06 Jul 2013
|align=left|
|align=left|
|-align=center
|20
|Win
|align=center|19–1||align=left| William Gare
|UD
|12
|19 Oct 2012 
|align=left|
|align=left| 
|-align=center
|19
|Win
|align=center|18–1||align=left| Ruben Eduardo Acosta
|UD
|10
|19 Jul 2012
|align=left|
|align=left| 
|-align=center
|18
|Loss
|align=center|17–1||align=left| Badou Jack
|SD
|8
|11 May 2012
|align=left|
|align=left|
|-align=center
|17
|Win
|align=center|17–0||align=left| Luzimar Gonzaga
|KO
|5 (10), 1:55
|30 Mar 2012
|align=left|
|align=left|
|- align=center
|16
|Win
|align=center|16–0||align=left| Gerardo Diaz
|KO
|6 (10), 1:00
|03 Feb 2012
|align=left|
|align=left| 
|- align=center
|15
|Win
|align=center|15–0||align=left| Terrance Woods	
|UD
|6
|20 Nov 2011
|align=left|
|align=left| 
|- align=center
|14
|Win
|align=center|14–0||align=left| Juan Villadiego
|KO
|2 (4), 0:54
|30 Sep 2011
|align=left|
|align=left|
|- align=center
|13
|Win
|align=center|13–0||align=left| Frank Mola
|UD
|6 
|19 Sep 2011
|align=left|
|align=left|
|- align=center
|12
|Win
|align=center|12–0||align=left| Tomas Orozco Rodriguez
|KO
|4 (10), 1:25
|28 Jan 2011
|align=left|
|align=left|
|- align=center
|11
|Win
|align=center|11–0||align=left| Manuel Banquez
|TKO
|6 (10), 2:31
|30 Oct 2010
|align=left|
|align=left|
|- align=center
|10
|Win
|align=center|10–0||align=left| Edwin Mota
|KO
|5 (12), 1:34
|09 Oct 2010
|align=left|
|align=left|
|- align=center
|9
|Win
|align=center|9–0||align=left| Wilmer Gonzalez
|KO
|2 (10), 2:57
|15 Aug 2010
|align=left|
|align=left|
|- align=center
|8
|Win
|align=center|8–0||align=left| Javier Meza
|KO
|1 (6), 2:05
|25 Jun 2010
|align=left|
|align=left|
|- align=center
|7
|Win
|align=center|7–0||align=left| Enrique Barbosa
|KO
|1 (6), 1:55
|30 Apr 2010
|align=left|
|align=left|
|- align=center
|6
|Win
|align=center|6–0||align=left| Elkin Lopez
|TKO
|2 (8)
|16 Apr 2010
|align=left|
|align=left|
|- align=center
|5
|Win
|align=center|5–0||align=left| Clemente Perez
|TKO
|5 (8)
|27 Mar 2010
|align=left|
|align=left|
|- align=center
|4
|Win
|align=center|4–0||align=left| Wilmer Enrique Gonzalez
|KO
|4 (8), 2:27
|14 Mar 2010
|align=left|
|align=left|
|- align=center
|3
|Win
|align=center|3–0||align=left| Leo Cassiani
|KO
|2 (8), 1:10
|27 Jan 2010
|align=left|
|align=left|
|- align=center
|2
|Win
|align=center|2–0||align=left| Jose Chiquillo
|TKO
|2 (8)
|26 Sep 2009
|align=left|
|align=left|
|- align=center
|1
|Win
|align=center|1–0||align=left| Ignacio Solar	
|TKO
|2 (4)
|09 Aug 2009
|align=left|
|align=left|
|- align=center
|}

References

1977 births
Living people
Sportspeople from Bogotá
Middleweight boxers
Boxers at the 2003 Pan American Games
Colombian male boxers
Pan American Games bronze medalists for Colombia
Pan American Games medalists in boxing
Central American and Caribbean Games gold medalists for Colombia
Central American and Caribbean Games bronze medalists for Colombia
Competitors at the 2002 Central American and Caribbean Games
Competitors at the 2006 Central American and Caribbean Games
Central American and Caribbean Games medalists in boxing
Medalists at the 2003 Pan American Games
20th-century Colombian people
21st-century Colombian people